Al-Fouta, alternatively transliterated as al-Futah, is a neighborhood and a subject of Baladiyah al-Malaz in Riyadh, Saudi Arabia. It came into being around the 1940s as a direct result of the development of al-Murabba neighborhood in its north as well as the construction of the Red Palace. It popularly hosts the Riyadh Water Tower, one of the notable landmarks in the city as well as the rest of the southern portion of the King Abdulaziz Historical Center, including the eponymous al-Fouta Park.

References 

Geography of Riyadh